Captain Gordon Budd Irving was a Canadian World War I flying ace credited with twelve aerial victories.

Early life
Gordon Budd Irving was the sole son of attorney William Henry Irving and Mary Maude Smith Irving. His childhood home was at 76 Spadina Street, Toronto; he attended church nearby at Trinity Methodist Church (present-day Trinity-Saint Paul's United).  After education at the Huron Street Public School and University of Toronto Schools, he was briefly employed by National Trust Company.

World War I service

Irving then joined the Royal Flying Corps in May, 1917 and sent to Camp Borden for training. He shipped out for England in July 1917. By November of that year, he had been trained and posted to No. 19 Squadron RFC. He was assigned a Sopwith Dolphin to fly.

Irving scored his first aerial victory on 24 March 1918; by 2 July, his count was up to three enemy planes destroyed and eight driven down out of control. During five of these victories, he had teamed with other aces, including Cecil Gardner, Finlay McQuistan, John Aldridge, James Hardman, and fellow Canadian Albert Desbrisay Carter. Irving had also risen to the position of Flight Commander in May.

Decoration and death
On 3 August, he was awarded the Distinguished Flying Cross. Eight days later, in a dogfight during a patrol, he drove down a Pfalz D.III fighter for his ninth out of control victory. Irving was reported as missing in action, as three Dolphins went down that day, one of them on fire. Irving's body was not recovered.

His Officer Commanding, Major D. J. Pretyman, wrote "...he is a great loss to my squadron as he was loved by all the officers and men, besides being a very gallant gentleman and always ready to do his best." The Prince of Wales posthumously awarded the DFC to Irving's sister, Mrs. Kathleen Purves. The most likely claimants for victory over Irving were either Justus Grassmann or Alois Heldmann.

Honours and awards
Distinguished Flying Cross (DFC)

Lt. (T./Capt.) Gordon Irving.

He has carried out numerous offensive patrols, and under his able leadership many enemy formations have been successfully engaged. He has personally accounted for six enemy aircraft, and by his consistent keenness and fearlessness he sets a fine example to the pilots in his squadron.

Sources of information

References
 Franks, Norman. Dolphin and Snipe Aces of World War 1. Osprey Publishing, 2002. , .
 Shores, Christopher F. et al. Above the Trenches: A Complete Record of the Fighter Aces and Units of the British Empire Air Forces 1915-1920. Grub Street, 1990. , .

1898 births
1918 deaths
Canadian aviators
Canadian flying aces
Canadian military personnel killed in World War I
People from Old Toronto
Military personnel from Toronto
Royal Flying Corps officers